Brent Di Cesare (born 7 April 1979), better known by his online alias Mark Goldbridge, is an English YouTuber and radio presenter, best known for his videos and livestreams on the Manchester United-based fan channel, The United Stand.

Personal life 
Goldbridge's real name is Brent Di Cesare. He has stated that he created the alias when he started his YouTube career. This alias was used at the request of his employers during his job as a police officer investigating financial fraud.

Goldbridge was born on 7 April 1979. He is of Italian origin. He was born in Nottingham and lives in Solihull.

YouTube career 
Goldbridge has four YouTube channels: "The United Stand" which consists of Manchester United content, "Mark Goldbridge That's Football" which consists of general football content and watchalongs of non-Manchester United matches, "Mark Goldbridge That's Entertainment" which consists of clips from his recent livestreams, and "Mark Goldbridge" which includes more personal content such as cooking, vlogging and general chit-chats. 

Goldbridge started The United Stand in 2014 under the name "Soccer Box TV", providing videos on Premier League match predictions. He then switched his content to post-match reactions of Manchester United games. Later, Goldbridge started live streaming watchalongs of the matches. BBC Sport has described these as "an amateur online version of Sky Sports' Soccer Saturday".

In September 2022, Goldbridge was invited to be one of the managers in the Sidemen charity match. There were two teams in the charity match. Sidemen FC which included the Sidemen and a few select people, including MrBeast and LazarBeam. The other team was the YouTube All Stars which included social media influencers such as IShowSpeed and Noah Beck. Goldbridge managed the YouTube All Stars, who lost 8–7 to Sidemen FC. In total, they raised over £1,000,000 for their select charities.

talkSPORT 
In April 2022, Goldbridge made his talkSPORT debut, presenting a late-night show.

Notes

References 

Officers in English police forces
English YouTubers
1979 births
Living people
English-language YouTube channels
YouTube channels launched in 2014
English people of Italian descent
Sports YouTubers